Hagos Gebrhiwet Berhe (born 11 May 1994) is an Ethiopian long-distance runner and the former World Junior Record holder in the 5000 meters (12:47:53).

Early life
Born in the Tigray Region, he took up running seriously in 2010. He came sixth in the 5000 metres at the 2011 Ethiopian National Championships and was selected to run the 3000 metres at that year's World Youth Championships, where he finished fifth with a time of 7:45.11 minutes. Hagos noted that his first national selection had helped him develop his running and he went on to win the junior title at the Ethiopian Club's Cross Country, competing for Mesfin Engineering.

Early career
His first major win came soon after, as he took the title at the San Silvestre Vallecana 10 km race in Spain. He defeated Spain's top distance runners and edged Teklemariam Medhin at the line in a personal best time of 27:57 minutes.

Career accomplishments
He came fourth in the junior section of the 2012 African Cross Country Championships. Hagos made his debut on American soil at the Boston Indoor Games, taking fourth place in a best of 7:44.08 minutes for the 3000 m. Still 17 years old, he was runner-up to World medallist Dejen Gebremeskel at the Carlsbad 5000. His time of 13:14 minutes was the fastest 5K road time ever for a junior athlete. He entered his first 5000 m Diamond League event at the Shanghai Golden Grand Prix in May and upset the field by winning in wet conditions, setting a meet record time of 13:11.00 minutes and beating athletes including Kenenisa Bekele and Augustine Choge. He performed well on the major circuit, coming runner-up at the Bislett Games, then setting a 5000 m world junior record of 12:47.53 minutes as runner-up at the Meeting Areva. He was selected for the Ethiopian Olympic team and came eleventh in the 5000 m Olympic final. He ended the year with a win at the Great Ethiopian Run in Addis Ababa.

In February 2013, he set a new junior world record in the 3000 m by winning the New Balance Indoor Grand Prix, beating Dejen Gebremeskel and Galen Rupp with a time of 7:32.87. In March 2013 he won the junior world cross country title in Bydgoszcz, Poland. At the 2013 World Championships in Athletics in Moscow, Gebriwhet won the silver medal in the 5000 m. He leaned at the finish line to beat Kenyan Isaiah Koech, and both were timed at 13:27.26. In March 2014, Gebrhiwet finished fifth in the 3000 m at the 2014 IAAF World Indoor Championships in a time of 7:56.34.

Major competition record

References

External links

Living people
1994 births
Ethiopian male long-distance runners
Sportspeople from Tigray Region
Athletes (track and field) at the 2012 Summer Olympics
Athletes (track and field) at the 2016 Summer Olympics
Olympic athletes of Ethiopia
World Athletics Championships athletes for Ethiopia
World Athletics Championships medalists
Olympic bronze medalists for Ethiopia
Olympic silver medalists in athletics (track and field)
Medalists at the 2016 Summer Olympics
Olympic male long-distance runners
Diamond League winners
21st-century Ethiopian people